Baskets is an American comedy-drama television series that premiered on January 21, 2016, on FX. The series was co-created by Louis C.K., Zach Galifianakis, and Jonathan Krisel; Krisel is also the showrunner and director. Galifianakis stars in the dual lead role as Chip Baskets, a failed professional clown in Paris, who instead becomes a local rodeo clown in Bakersfield, California, and his twin brother, Dale Baskets. Galifianakis, C.K., M. Blair Breard, Dave Becky, Marc Gurvitz and Andrea Pett-Joseph serve as executive producers, with FX Productions as the production company. In 2017 C.K.'s production company Pig Newton had all ties to the show and FX cut after C.K. admitted to sexual misconduct with five women. On May 24, 2018, FX renewed the show for a fourth and final season, which premiered on June 13, 2019. The series ended on August 22, 2019.

Premise
Chip Baskets aims to become a professional clown. After failing to get a degree at a prestigious clowning school in Paris, he is stuck with a job at a local rodeo in his hometown of Bakersfield, California.

Cast

Main cast
Zach Galifianakis as twin brothers Chip Baskets and Dale Everett Baskets.
Martha Kelly as Martha Brooks, a low-key insurance agent who is Chip's only friend, tolerating his angry and rude treatment of her.
Louie Anderson as Christine Baskets, mother of Chip and Dale.

Recurring cast
Sabina Sciubba as Penelope (seasons 1-2, 4), a wealthy young French woman, with a modicum of singing talent. She is married to Chip, but only married him to get a green card so that she could live in the United States.
Ernest Adams as Eddie, the owner and manager of the Buckaroo Rodeo, who hires Chip because he will give a job to anyone who actually wants to work there for low pay and at huge risk of injury.
Garry and Jason Clemmons as Cody and Logan Baskets (seasons 1-2, 4), Chip's brothers, who are twins.
Ellen D. Williams as Nicole Baskets, Dale's wife.
Malia Pyles as Sarah Baskets, Dale's elder daughter.
Julia Rose Gruenberg as Crystal Baskets, Dale's younger daughter.
Ivy Jones as Grandma (seasons 1-2), Chip and Dale's grandma.
Adam Zastrow (season 1) and Tommy Snider (seasons 2-4) as Jode, a former Clown and current Arby's manager, who dates Trinity and is friends with Chip.
 Maree Cheatham as Maggie, Christine's friend.
Alex Morris as Ken (seasons 2-4),  Christine's new boyfriend, who is a Denver-based carpet supply company owner.
Mary Wiseman as Trinity (seasons 2-4), a former clown and current Arby's worker, who dates Jode and is friends with Chip.
Peter Jason as Jim (seasons 2-4), Chip and Dale's uncle and Christine's brother.
Ryun Yu as Daniel (seasons 3-4), a reverend.
Andrea Marcovicci as Tammy Nielman Zemonski (season 4), a life coach.
Anna Konkle as Anita (season 4), a realtor.

Production
In December 2013, Louis C.K.'s production company, Pig Newton, signed a deal with FX for him to create new shows for their various networks. FX ordered a pilot episode for Baskets with C.K. and Galifianakis to co-write, and Galifianakis to star. On August 27, 2014, FX picked up the show for a 10-episode first season with production to commence in 2015.
 	
In November 2017, after Louis C.K. confirmed the sexual misconduct allegations against him were true, FX canceled their overall deal with C.K. and his production company, Pig Newton. C.K. would have no involvement in future seasons of the series.

Baskets incorporated several ideas Galifianakis originally came up with for Between Two Ferns: The Movie but were discarded early in the film's development.

Episodes

Series overview

Season 1 (2016)

Season 2 (2017)

Season 3 (2018)

Season 4 (2019)

Reception
Baskets has received positive reviews from critics. Rotten Tomatoes gives the first season 70% with an average score of 7.4 out of 10, based on 36 reviews. The site's consensus reads, "Though its themes may be unpleasant for some and LOL moments are few and far between, Baskets succeeds on the strength of its deadpan delivery and terrific cast." On Metacritic, the first season holds a score of 68 out of 100, based on 32 reviews, indicating "generally favorable reviews".

Accolades

Broadcast
Internationally, the series premiered in Australia on January 26, 2016. It aired in the UK on Fox from April 13, 2017.

References

External links

2010s American black comedy television series
2010s American comedy-drama television series
2010s American surreal comedy television series
2016 American television series debuts
2019 American television series endings
Cross-dressing in television
English-language television shows
FX Networks original programming
Primetime Emmy Award-winning television series
Television shows about clowns
Television series about twins
Television series by 20th Century Fox Television
Television series by 3 Arts Entertainment
Television series created by Louis C.K.
Television shows set in Bakersfield, California